Beuningen is a municipality and a town in the eastern Netherlands. The municipality consists of the towns Beuningen, Ewijk, Winssen and Weurt.  to the north lies the river Waal

Beuningen lies adjacent to the A73 (Nijmegen-Venlo, on the south side) and A50 (Zwolle-Eindhoven, in the west) motorway interchange. East of Beuningen lies the city Nijmegen. There is a restored windmill in the town, De Haag.

Population centres

History
The area in and around Beuningen was inhabited by the Romans. There are regularly excavations done in which Roman rests are found. 
In the 15th century there stood a small castle: Blanckenburgh. It was probably destroyed during the Eighty Years' War by Maurice of Orange.
Until about 1900 Beuningen was a poor farmers village, often struck by floods. Nevertheless, there were a few rich families, mostly farmers with a lot of land, who paid the highest tax in the area.
On January 1, 1818, the municipality annexed town Weurt in the East and on July 1, 1980, the town Ewijk on the West.

Nowadays Beuningen has grown to a suburb of Nijmegen, with a lot of new neighbourhoods.

Topography

Dutch Topographic map of the municipality of Beuningen, June 2015.

Monuments
There are several monuments in Beuningen. Here are a few (in chronological order):

See also
 Lancaster Memorial (Netherlands)

Notable people 
 Willem Joseph baron van Ghent tot Drakenburgh (1626 in Winssen – 1672) a 17th-century Dutch admiral
 Willie Smits (born 1957, in Weurt) a trained forester, microbiologist, conservationist, animal rights activist, wilderness engineer and social entrepreneur in Borneo
 Bas van Bemmelen (born 1989 in Beuningen) a volleyball player with the Netherlands men's national volleyball team
 Frans Lelivelt a successful entrepreneur and writer with special connections to Nottingham (England)

Gallery

References

External links

Official website

 
Municipalities of Gelderland
Populated places in Gelderland